

Description
Arthritica bifurca is a hermaphroditic bivalve mollusc, with a shell length of approximately 6mm.
Arthritica bifurca has D-shaped larvae.

Distribution
Arthritica bifurca is found free-living in mud or muddy sand habitats in New Zealand estuaries.

References

Lasaeidae